Miguel Capuccini (January 5, 1904 in Montevideo – June 9, 1980) was a Uruguayan footballer. He was part of the team that won the first ever World Cup in 1930 for Uruguay but did not play any matches in the tournament.

References

World Cup Champions Squads 1930 - 2002
O nascimento da mítica Celeste Olímpica 

1904 births
Footballers from Montevideo
Uruguayan footballers
Uruguayan people of Italian descent
Uruguay international footballers
1930 FIFA World Cup players
FIFA World Cup-winning players
Uruguayan Primera División players
Peñarol players
Montevideo Wanderers F.C. players
1980 deaths
Association football goalkeepers